"Take Out the Gunman" is the lead single from Chevelle's seventh studio album, La Gárgola. The song debuted on February 3, 2014, via the band's Vevo and YouTube channel, with the single being released the next day.

Critical reception
Sound and Motion Magazine gave the song a positive review. They state "From the tones, the rhythms, the vocal delivery, it’s all there, if it’s been in a Chevelle song, any Chevelle song, it somehow got crammed into here, with a few minor, minor twists. Yet still sounds fresh and invigorating." They conclude that the track leaves you wanting more. Loudwire ranked it the fourth greatest Chevelle song.

Charts

Weekly charts

Year-end charts

References

Chevelle (band) songs
2014 songs
2014 singles
Songs written by Pete Loeffler
Epic Records singles
Songs written by Sam Loeffler